The Qatari Basketball League is the top-tier men's basketball league operating in Qatar. The winning team obtains the participation right to the FIBA Asia Champions Cup. The first official season took place in 1981/82. There is a second division and two domestic cup tournaments, the Emir of Qatar Cup and the Qatar Crown Prince Cup.

In the 2012–13 season, the league expanded for the first time in its history, going from 8 to 12 teams with the newly entered clubs including Lekhwiya, Al-Shamal Sports Club, Umm Salal SC, and Al-Khor Sports Club.

Current clubs
As of the 2021–22 season.

Championship history 

1981–82: Al Arabi
1982–83: Al Arabi
1983–84: Al Arabi
1984–85: Al Arabi
1985–86: Al Arabi
1986–87: Qatar SC
1987–88: Qatar SC
1988–89: Qatar SC
1989–90: Qatar SC
1990–91: Qatar SC
1991–92: Al Arabi
1992–93: Qatar SC
1993–94: Al Arabi
1994–95: Qatar SC
1995–96: Al-Rayyan
1996–97: Al-Rayyan

1997–98: Al-Rayyan
1998–99: Al-Rayyan
1999–2000: Al-Rayyan
2000–01: Al Ahli SC
2001–02: Al-Rayyan
2002–03: Al-Rayyan
2003–04: Al-Rayyan
2004–05: Al-Rayyan
2005–06: Al-Rayyan
2006–07: Al-Rayyan
2007–08: El Jaish
2008–09: Al-Rayyan
2009–10: Al-Rayyan
2010–11: Al-Rayyan
2011–12: Al-Rayyan
2012–13: Al Sadd
2013–14: Al-Gharafa SC
2014–15:Al Rayyan
2015–16: Al Rayyan
2016–17: El Jaish
2017–18: Al Arabi
2018–19: Al Shamal
2019–20: Al Shamal
2020–21: Al-Gharafa
2021–22: Al Sadd

List of medal winners

Top-performing clubs

Total titles won by town or city

Domestic competitions

Qatar Crown Prince Cup 

1999–2000 : Al Ahli SC d. Al-Rayyan
2000–01 : Al Ahli SC d. Al Sadd
2001–02 : Al-Rayyan d. Qatar SC
2002–03 : Qatar SC d. Al-Rayyan
2003–04 : Al-Rayyan d. Qatar SC
2004–05 : Al-Rayyan d. Al Sadd
2005–06 : Al-Rayyan d. Al Gharafa

2006–07 : Al Arabi d. Al Sadd
2007–08 : Al-Rayyan d. Qatar SC
2008–09 : Al-Rayyan d. Qatar SC
2009–10 : El Jaish d. Al Gharafa
2010–11 : Al Gharafa d. Al Sadd
2011–12 :  Al Arabi d. El Jaish

Emir of Qatar Cup 

2000 : Al-Rayyan d. Al Arabi
2001 : Al-Rayyan d. Al Wakrah
2002 : Qatar SC d. Al-Rayyan
2003 : Al-Rayyan d. Qatar SC
2004 : Al Sadd d. Al-Rayyan
2005 : Al-Rayyan d. Al Arabi

2006 : Al-Rayyan d. Al Arabi
2007 : Qatar SC d. Al Sadd
2008 : Al-Rayyan d. Qatar SC
2009 : Al-Rayyan d. Qatar SC
2010 : Al Gharafa d. Al-Rayyan
2011 : Al Gharafa d. Al-Rayyan

2012 : Al Rayyan d. Al Sadd
2013 : Al Rayyan d. Al Sadd
2014 : Al Gharafa d El Jaish
2015 : El Jaish d Al Sadd
2016 : El Jaish d. Al Gharafa

See also 
 FIBA Asia Champions Cup

References

External links
Asia Basket - Division I
Sporting Pulse - QBF

Basketball in Qatar
Basketball leagues in Asia
Sports leagues in Qatar